This is a list of Native American actors in the United States, including Alaskan Natives.

While Native American identity can be complex, it is rooted in political sovereignty that predates the creation of colonial nation states like the United States, Canada, and Mexico and persists into the 21st century recognized under international law by treaty. The Bureau of Indian Affairs defines Native American as having American Indian or Alaska Native ancestry. Legally, being Native American is defined as being enrolled in a federally recognized tribe, including Alaskan villages. Ethnologically, factors such as culture, history, language, religion, and familial kinships can influence Native American identity. All individuals on this list should have confirmed Native American ancestry. Historical figures might predate tribal enrollment practices and would be included based on ethnological tribal membership, while any contemporary individuals should either be enrolled members of federally recognized tribes or have cited Native American ancestry and be recognized as being Native American by their respective tribes(s). Contemporary unenrolled individuals should only be listed as being of descent from a tribe if they have confirmed heritage.

A 
Victor Aaron (1956–1996), Yaqui descent
Apesanahkwat, Menominee Nation

B
Dewey Beard a.k.a. Iron Hail, Lakota, Miniconjou
Chief John Big Tree, Seneca
Moses Brings Plenty, Oglala Lakota

C
Tonantzin Carmelo, Tongva/Kumeyaay descent
Alaqua Cox, Menominee/Mohican

D
Cody Deal (born 1986), Osage Nation

E
Chris Eyre, Southern Cheyenne director and producer

F
Abel Fernandez (1930–2016), Yaqui descent

G
Forrest Goodluck, Navajo
Kiowa Gordon, Hualapai Tribe
Rodney A. Grant, Omaha
Saginaw Grant, member of Sac and Fox Nation
Kimberly Norris Guerrero, Colville (enrolled), Salish-Kootenai, and Cherokee

H
Charlie Hill, Oneida, Mohawk, Cree
Nathan Lee Chasing His Horse, Lakota
Jack Hoxie, Nez Perce
Miko Hughes, Chickasaw
 Blu Hunt - American actress, Oglala Lakota

I
 Iron Hail, a.k.a. Dewey Beard, Lakota, Miniconjou

J
Ben Johnson, Cherokee, grew up on an Osage reservation

K
Oscar Kawagley, Yup'ik
Geraldine Keams,  Navajo
Stepfanie Kramer, Eastern Band Cherokee

L
Eddie Little Sky, Oglala Lakota
Phil Lucas, Choctaw Nation of Oklahoma filmmaker, actor, writer, producer, director, and editor

M
 Randolph Mantooth, Seminole
 Robin Maxkii, Stockbridge-Munsee, actress 
Zahn McClarnon, Hunkpapa Lakota, actor
Russell Means, Oglala Lakota, activist, actor
Tatanka Means, Navajo, Lakota
Amber Midthunder (Fort Peck Sioux)

Q

R
Arthur Redcloud, Navajo
Red Shirt (Oglala), Lakota
Red Wing, (Lillian St. Cyr), Winnebago Tribe of Nebraska
Steve Reevis, Blackfeet
Branscombe Richmond, Aleut
Pernell Roberts, film and television actor, Muscogee
 Will Rogers (1879–1935), Cherokee, film and vaudeville actor, movie producer
Ned Romero, film and television actor, Chitimacha

S
Frank Salsedo, Wappo 
Will Sampson, Muscogee (Creek) Nation
Larry Sellers, Osage, Cherokee, Lakota
Martin Sensmeier, Tlingit, Koyukon Athabascan
Sitting Bull, Lakota, Hunkpapa
John Sitting Bull, Lakota, Hunkpapa
William Sitting Bull, Lakota, Hunkpapa
Eddie Spears, Brulé
Michael Spears, Brulé
Chaske Spencer, Sioux-Nez Perce-Cherokee-Muscogee Creek-French-Dutch
Luther Standing Bear, Oglala Lakota author and actor
Wes Studi, Cherokee Nation

T
Jim Thorpe, Sac and Fox
Chief Thunderbird, Cheyenne
John Trudell, Dakota people
Sheila Tousey, Menominee, Stockbridge-Munsee

U
 Misty Upham, Blackfeet Tribe

W
Noah Watts, Crow/Blackfeet
Floyd Red Crow Westerman, Sisseton Wahpeton Oyate

Y
James Young Deer, Nanticoke, 1876–1946
Chief Yowlachie, Yakima

See also
 List of Native Americans of the United States
 List of Indigenous Canadian actors
 Indian Actors Association

Notes

Native American
Actors
 
Native
Native American actresses